USS Martin (DE-30) was an  constructed for the United States Navy during World War II. The ship was promptly sent off into the Pacific Ocean to protect convoys and other ships from Japanese submarines and fighter aircraft. The vessel entered service in 1943 and spent its entire career in the Pacific Ocean. Following the surrender of Japan, Martin returned to the United States and by the end of 1945, was slated for scrapping, which began in 1946.

Namesake
Luther Charles Martin was born on 10 December 1903 in Indianapolis, Indiana. He enrolled in the United States Naval Reserve on 15 July 1920 to serve in an enlisted status until 4 November 1937 when he was appointed carpenter.

Service history 
Originally intended for lend-lease to Great Britain, USS Martin (DE-30) was laid down as BDE-30 by Mare Island Navy Yard, Vallejo, California, on 26 November 1942. The ship was launched on 18 May 1943, redesignated DE-30, on 16 June 1943 and renamed Martin on 23 June 1943. The destroyer escort was commissioned on 4 September 1943.

Assigned to the U.S. Pacific Fleet, Martin escorted the battleship  to San Diego, California, on 29 September to 2 October. After shakedown off San Diego, the escort ship got underway in convoy for Pearl Harbor on 11 November, arriving 21 November for service with TF 16.
 
On 9 January 1944 Martin sailed with TG 58.4 for escort service during the initial Marshall operations, on 11 January into late February. From arrival at Tulagi on 18 March until 1 October she operated as a merchant ship escort in the Solomons.

During October the ship joined TG 30.8 to escort fueling units during the strikes on Formosa; Luzon, Philippines; and Okinawa, Ryūkyūs, beginning on 10 October. From November to February 1945 she patrolled the western Carolines and Marianas. On 10 December 1944 Martin screened LSTs landing troops and supplies on Leyte for the mop-up operations following the landings in October and the ensuing Battle for Leyte Gulf. She operated out of Eniwetok from February 1945 on, escorting convoys to Kwajalein and Guam, Marshalls, and Ulithi, Carolines.
 
On 5 July Martin departed Kwajalein for the west coast, via Pearl Harbor, arriving at San Francisco, California, on 19 July. On 19 November she decommissioned at Mare Island Navy Yard and was struck from the Navy List on 5 December. Martin was sold to Wilmington Transportation Co., Wilmington, Los Angeles, on 15 May, and delivered on 3 June 1946 to be scrapped.

Awards

References

External links
 

Evarts-class destroyer escorts
Ships built in Vallejo, California
1943 ships
World War II frigates and destroyer escorts of the United States